Julius Hallervorden (21 October 1882 – 29 May 1965) was a German physician and neuroscientist.  

Hallervorden was born in Allenburg, East Prussia (Druzhba, Znamensk, Kaliningrad Oblast, Russia) to psychiatrist Eugen Hallervorden. He studied medicine at the Albertina in Königsberg. He worked in Berlin in 1909/10 and from 1913 on in Landsberg/Warthe (Gorzów Wielkopolski). In 1921 and 1925/26 he worked at the Deutsche Forschungsanstalt für Psychatrie in Munich, he left Landsberg in 1929 to organize a centralized psychiatric healthcare in the Province of Brandenburg.

In 1938, he became the head of the Neuropathology Department of the Kaiser Wilhelm Institute for Brain Research.  He was a member of the Nazi Party, and admitted to knowingly performing much of his research on the brains of executed prisoners and participated in the action T4 euthanasia program.  

In a conversation with Leo Alexander, a Jewish Austrian neurologist and Holocaust refugee who was forced to emigrate to the United States during World War II, Hallervorden said the following of his participation in the T4 program:

 
Along with Hugo Spatz, Hallervorden is credited with the discovery of Hallervorden-Spatz syndrome (now referred to as Pantothenate kinase-associated neurodegeneration). After World War II, Hallervorden became President of the German Neuropathological Society and continued his research at the Max Planck Institute in Giessen, Germany.

See also
List of medical eponyms with Nazi associations

References

1882 births
1965 deaths
People from Gvardeysky District
People from East Prussia
University of Königsberg alumni
German neuroscientists
Nazi human subject research
Physicians in the Nazi Party